Théodore Tronchin (1582–1657) was a Genevan Calvinist theologian, controversialist and Hebraist.

Life
He was born at Geneva on 17 April 1582, the son of Rémi Tronchin and Théodora Rocca, the adopted daughter of Théodore de Bèze. He studied theology at Geneva, Basel, Heidelberg, Franeker, and Leiden. He became professor of oriental languages at the academy of Geneva in 1606; he was preacher there in 1608, and professor of theology in 1618. He was rector in 1610.

In 1618 he was sent with his colleague Giovanni Diodati to the Synod of Dort, as Genevan delegate, where he spoke in favour of the perseverance of the saints. In 1632 he was army chaplain under Henri, Duke of Rohan, during his final campaign in Valtellina. In 1655 he was one of the delegation that conferred in Geneva with John Dury.

He died in Geneva on 19 November 1657. The theologian Louis Tronchin was his son. His daughter Renée married the printer Pierre Chouet, and the theologian Jean-Robert Chouet was their son.

Views
He was an orthodox Calvinist, opposed to Amyraldism.

Works
He was asked to reply to the Jesuit Pierre Coton, who in Genève plagiaire (1618) had attacked the Genevan Bible translation, the Bible de Genève. Benédict Turrettini answered quickly in 1618, to the early parts of the book; and Coton published a rebuttal. Tronchin's answer Coton plagiaire (also Cotton) appeared at the beginning of 1620.

Other works were:
De bonis operibus (1628); 
Oratio funebria de Henrico duce Rohani (1638); 
De peccato originali (1658).

His 1628 funeral oration for Simon Goulart is known for the hint in it that Goulart knew the author of the Vindiciae contra tyrannos.

References

External links

CERL page
 Old dictionary entry

Attribution

1582 births
1657 deaths
Theologians from the Republic of Geneva
Supralapsarians
Calvinist and Reformed Christians
Christian Hebraists
Participants in the Synod of Dort
17th-century people from the Republic of Geneva
17th-century Calvinist and Reformed theologians
Academic staff of the University of Geneva